University of Lahore (abbreviated as UoL), established in 2002, is a private university It is located on 1-km Defence Road, Lahore, Punjab, Pakistan. The University College of Medicine and Dentistry  is registered with Pakistan Medical and Dental Council since 2007. The degree-awarding university is University of Lahore. Admission in MBBS and BDS is governed by UHS. Approved by The Ministry of Health. University Dental Hospital and University Teaching Hospital are attached as training and teaching hospitals. The college enrolls 150 students for 5-year MBBS and 75 students for BDS each year.  In October 2019, Pakistan Medical & Dental Council (PMDC) ranked UCMD in A+ Category with 95% scoring in their recent inspection among 169 public and private medical colleges with Pakistan. UCMD now stands among Top 10 Medical Colleges of Pakistan. The college is famous for its lush green, purpose-built campus and good international rankings of the degree awarding University. Its modular system of education is inspired by Harvard Medical school and Aga Khan Medical University which give the students a better exposure to advanced study scheme.

Programs offered
Undergraduate Programs:-
 Bachelor of Medicine & Bachelor of Surgery (MBBS)
 Bachelor of Dental Surgery (BDS)
Postgraduate Programs:-
 MSc. Public Health
 MSc. International Health
 MSc. Medical Education
 MDS (Dentistry)
 Fellowship in Oral & Maxillo-facial Surgery (FCPS)
Fellowship in Internal Medicine ,FCPS MEDICINE
Fellowship in Ophthalmology, FCPS OPHTHALMOLOGY 
Fellowship in gynaecology £ Obstrectics,FCPS GYNAE N OBS
MCPS FAMILY MEDICINE 
MCPS RADIOLOGY 
MCPS GYNAE OBS 
 Fellowship in Orthodontics (FCPS)
MPhil/PhD Programs:-
 MPhil Physiology
 MPhil Microbiology
 MPhil Biochemistry
 PhD Physiology
 PhD Microbiology
 PhD Biochemistry

Teaching hospitals
 University of Lahore Teaching Hospital
 University of Lahore Dental Hospital
 Nawaz Sharif Social Security Hospital
 Al-Khidmat Hospital, Lahore

Student life
 Library Facilities
 Sports Facilities
 Transport
 IT Facilities
 IT Helpdesk
 Hostels/Accommodation
 Gym (UOL Club)
 Catering & Cafeteria
 Finance & Scholarships
 Medical & Dental Health
 Swimming pool

Affiliations
Pakistan Medical & Dental Council & University of Health Sciences
 (PMDC)
()

UHS 
()

See also
University of Lahore

External links
  
 Profile at IMED

12
36

Medical colleges in Punjab, Pakistan
Dental schools in Pakistan
University of Lahore
Educational institutions established in 2001
2001 establishments in Pakistan